"Jambalaya (On the Bayou)" is a song written and recorded by American country music singer Hank Williams that was first released in July 1952. It is Williams' most covered song. Named for a Creole and Cajun dish, jambalaya, it spawned numerous cover versions and has since achieved popularity in several different music genres.

Composition 
Williams began writing the song while listening to the Cajuns talk about food on the Hadacol Caravan bus.  With a melody based on the Cajun song "Grand Texas", some sources, including AllMusic, claim that the song was co-written by Williams and Moon Mullican, with Williams credited as sole author and Mullican receiving ongoing royalties.  Williams' biographer Colin Escott speculates that it is likely Mullican wrote at least some of the song and Hank's music publisher Fred Rose paid him surreptitiously so that he wouldn't have to split the publishing with Moon's label King Records.  Williams' song resembles "Grand Texas" in melody only. "Grand Texas" is a song about a lost love, a woman who left the singer to go with another man to "Big Texas"; "Jambalaya", while maintaining a Cajun theme, is about life, parties and stereotypical food of Cajun cuisine.  The narrator leaves to pole a pirogue down the shallow water of the bayou, to attend a party with his girlfriend Yvonne and her family.  At the feast they have Cajun cuisine, notably Jambalaya, crawfish pie and filé gumbo, and drink liquor from fruit jars. Yvonne is his [ma] "chère amie", which is Cajun French for "my dear (female) friend" or more likely to mean "my girlfriend".

Recording and release 
Williams recorded the song on June 13, 1952, his first recording session in six months, at Castle Studio in Nashville with backing provided by Jerry Rivers (fiddle), Don Helms (steel guitar), Chet Atkins (lead guitar), Chuck Wright (bass) and probably Ernie Newton (bass). The recording Williams made differs significantly from Mullican's, which was released in the same month as Williams' version but with a different order of verses and extra rhyming couplets.

Since the original melody of the song was from "Grand Texas", the song is a staple of Cajun culture. However, although Williams kept a Louisiana theme, the song is not a true cajun song, which helped the song gain widespread popularity:

Released in July 1952, it reached number one on the U.S. country charts for fourteen non-consecutive weeks. Williams performed "Jambalaya" at the Louisiana Hayride as part of his "homecoming" in fall, 1952 (after being fired from the Grand Ole Opry). A live recording released as part of a series of Hayride performances includes outbursts of applause.  Another unreleased version is included in the 2017 CD set, At the Louisiana Hayride Tonight.

After Williams released his version, Cajuns recorded the song again using Cajun instruments. However, they used Williams' lyrics translated into the Cajun French language. "Jambalaya" remains one of Hank Williams' most popular songs today. International, translated or derived versions exist at least in Chinese, Dutch, Finnish, French, Italian, Polish, German, Spanish, Estonian and Swedish.

A demo version of Williams singing "Jambalaya (On the Bayou)" with just his guitar, likely recorded in 1951, is also available. Williams composed a sequel to the song from the female perspective, "I'm Yvonne (Of the Bayou)", recorded by Goldie Hill. It was not as popular. As with "Jambalaya" there is speculation that Williams may have written this song with Mullican and their friend Jimmy Rule.

Chart performance

Cover versions 

It was recorded by Jo Stafford for Columbia Records on July 20, 1952, reaching #3 on the Billboard pop charts (and making the song well known to people other than country music fans).
Brenda Lee covered the song in 1956 for Decca Records at the age of eleven.  It was her first hit, coming two months after appearing on Ozark Jubilee.
Fats Domino covered the song in 1961 as a single, which was later featured on the compilation “Million Sellers by Fats” in 1962.
Gerry and the Pacemakers covered the song on their album How Do You Like It? in 1963.
The Nitty Gritty Dirt Band's version peaked at #84 in 1972.
John Fogerty hit #16 in 1973 under the name of the Blue Ridge Rangers.
The Carpenters featured the song, in an uptempo pop version with country flourishes, on their 1973 album Now & Then. Their version was released as a single outside the United States in 1974 and sold well in the UK (peaking at number 12 in the charts) and Japan.
New Orleans-based blues musician Professor Longhair released a version on his album "Rock 'n' Roll Gumbo" released in 1974.
Pop singer Alexia released a eurodance version in 1996.
In 2003, the Mexican Duranguense band K-Paz De La Sierra adapted the song into a Spanish rendition with original lyrics for their debut album Arrasando Con Fuego. The single reached 30 on the U.S. Billboard Hot Latin Tracks.
A cover version was recorded by Tab Benoit for his 1999 release "These Blues Are All Mine".

See also
 Billboard Top Country & Western Records of 1952

References

Sources

External links 
 Excerpt of Brenda Lee singing "Jambalaya", April 9, 1960 on Ozark Jubilee

Songs written by Hank Williams
1952 songs
1974 singles
Hank Williams songs
John Fogerty songs
Jo Stafford songs
Nitty Gritty Dirt Band songs
Grammy Hall of Fame Award recipients
MGM Records singles
The Carpenters songs
A&M Records singles